The Beijing–Qinhuangdao Expressway, designated as G0121 (formerly G1N) and commonly abbreviated as Jingqin Expressway is an expressway in northeastern China linking the cities of Beijing and Qinhuangdao.  This expressway is a branch of G1 Jingha Expressway.

Detailed Itinerary

References

Expressways in Beijing
Expressways in Hebei
0121